Below is a complete list of the Commonwealth Games records in swimming, ratified by the Commonwealth Games Federation (CGF). Competition is held in long course (50 m) pools.

This is not to be confused with Commonwealth records, which are records by athletes from Commonwealth nations, but performed in any meet or competition.

Men's events

Women's events

Mixed relay

Record holder's gallery
Some of the current Commonwealth Games record holders in swimming:

See also

Commonwealth Games records

References

External links
Commonwealth Games Federation - Commonwealth Games Records by Sport - Swimming

Swimming
C
Swimming at the Commonwealth Games